Bandhu Mahto  is an Indian politician. He was a Member of Parliament, representing Bihar in the Rajya Sabha, the upper house of India's Parliament, representing the Indian National Congress.

References

Rajya Sabha members from Bihar
1934 births
Living people
Indian National Congress politicians from Bihar